Aurielle Marie (born 1994) is an American poet and activist. Their debut collection Gumbo Ya Ya received the 2020 Cave Canem Poetry Prize and the Lambda Literary Award for Bisexual Poetry.

Career 
Marie was born in Atlanta, Georgia and raised on the southwest side of the city. Growing up, they were active in Black-oriented youth organizations that nurtured creativity. As a result, began writing poetry in their childhood.

Marie has worked with Atlanta-based organizations focused on civil rights and other social justice issues. They first became involved with community organizing after the killing of Michael Brown and the Ferguson uprising that followed. Marie was an organizer with the grassroots organization It's Bigger Than You.

Marie said their poetry focuses on "my sexuality, my body, my trauma, and the world I live in." Marie has published poetry in outlets including The Rumpus, BOATT, Poets.org, The Adroit Journal, Poetry Daily, and TriQuarterly Press. 

They won the 2020 Cave Canem Poetry Prize for their debut collection Gumbo Ya Ya. As a result, the collection was published by University of Pittsburgh Press and released in fall 2021. Poets & Writers described the collection as "a swirl of texts and voices, with visually inventive typography and poems, some featuring words cascading down the page, layered on top of one another, or pushing beyond the margins. The book subverts and refuses form."

Personal life 
Marie is genderqueer and uses she/they pronouns.

Works

Accolades 
 2018 – Lambda Literary Writer Retreat fellow
 2019 – Los Angeles Review Literary Award for Poetry (for "The Blues, Reproductive")
 2019–2020 – Ploughshares Emerging Writers Contest
 2020 – Cave Canem Poetry Prize (for Gumbo Ya Ya)
 2021 – Furious Flower Poetry Prize
 2022 – Lambda Literary Award for Bisexual Poetry (for Gumbo Ya Ya)
 2022 – Georgia Author of the Year Award, Poetry Full-Length Book (for Gumbo Ya Ya)
 2022 – Out100

References

External links 
 Official website

1994 births
Living people
People with non-binary gender identities
African-American poets
African-American activists
Writers from Atlanta
Non-binary writers
Non-binary activists
LGBT people from Georgia (U.S. state)